Yangwu may refer to:

In Chinese mythology, a three-legged sun crow, see Three-legged crow#Sun crow in Chinese mythology
Self-Strengthening Movement ( 1861–1895), also known as Yangwu Movement, institutional reforms during the late Qing dynasty

Places
Yangwu, Guizhou (扬武), a town in Danzhai County, Guizhou, China
Yangwu, Yunnan (扬武), a town in Xinping Yi and Dai Autonomous County, Yunnan, China

See also
Wu (Ten Kingdoms) (902 or 907–937), also known as Yang Wu, a southern Chinese state during the Five Dynasties period, ruled by the House of Yang
Yang Wu, a Former Yan official and regent during the Sixteen Kingdoms period